Provosty is a surname derived as a variation of the French surname Provost. People with the surname include:

Albin Provosty (1865–1932), Louisiana attorney
Nathlie Provosty (born 1981), American visual artist
Olivier O. Provosty (1852–1924), Chief Justice of the Louisiana Supreme Court

See also
 Provost (name)
 Provoost 
 Yasna Provoste (born 1969), Chilean teacher and Christian Democrat politician